Matías Martín (Hebrew: מתיאס מרטין; born 21 March 1989 in Argentina) is an Argentinean footballer.

References

External links
 Interview (Audio)

Argentine footballers
Living people
Association football forwards
1989 births
Tiro Federal footballers
Hapoel Rishon LeZion F.C. players
Hapoel Afula F.C. players
Hapoel Jerusalem F.C. players
Maccabi Ahi Nazareth F.C. players